"On My Side" is a song by American rapper YoungBoy Never Broke Again. It was released on September 17, 2021, as the fifth single from his third studio album Sincerely, Kentrell (2021). The song peaked at number 37 on the Billboard Hot 100.

Composition
The song sees YoungBoy singing about women, successes and guns, and is a story of how "someone who may have gotten involved in something they'll soon regret".

Charts

References

2021 singles
2021 songs
Atlantic Records singles
Songs written by YoungBoy Never Broke Again
YoungBoy Never Broke Again songs